Richard H. Tomlinson,  (c. 1924 – 2018) was a Canadian chemist and philanthropist. He is a founding director of Gennum Corp., a Canadian manufacturer of semiconductors and semiconductor-based products, and he made one of the largest single donations to a Canadian university.

He studied at Bishop's College School, Bishop's University and received a Ph.D. in chemistry in 1948 from McGill University. In 1950, he joined the Department of Chemistry at McMaster University. He retired in 1988. In 2000, he made a donation of Can$64 million to McGill University which will be used to create Fellowships.

In 2003, he was made an Officer of the Order of Canada.

He died on Sunday, January 28, 2018, at the age of 94.

References

 McGill Reporter: So who is this guy?
 McGill Newsroom: McGill benefactor Richard Tomlinson made history

External links
 Richard H. Tomlinson Fellowships

See also 
List of Bishop's College School alumni

1920s births
2018 deaths
Bishop's University alumni
Bishop's College School alumni
Canadian chemists
Canadian philanthropists
McGill University Faculty of Science alumni
McMaster University alumni
Officers of the Order of Canada
20th-century philanthropists